The 2009–10 version of the Jordan FA Cup was the 30th edition to be played. It is the premier knockout tournament for football teams in Jordan.

Al-Faisaly (Amman) went into this edition as the club with the most wins, on 16.

Al-Wihdat were the current holders and won it for the second straight time.

The cup winner was guaranteed a place in the 2011 AFC Cup.

Round of 16
Home and away match knock out stage, played at 13 and 18 September 2009.

|}

Quarter-finals
Home and away match knock out stage, played at 2 and 7 May 2011.

|}

Semi-finals
Home and away match knock out stage, played at 14 and 15, and 21 and 22 May 2011.

|}

Final

References

Jordan FA Cup seasons
Jordan
Cup